Barak Eilam is an American–Israeli executive. He is the chief executive officer of NICE (NASDAQ:NICE) He became the CEO in 2014, after spending over 15 years with the company. Eilam led the transformation and strategy of evolving NICE into a cloud enterprise software company. This transition was achieved through organic innovations as well as acquisitions of multiple companies of businesses as well as the divestiture of a number of subsidiaries to focus the company on cloud and analytics. These strategic moves drove the company's accelerated growth in the last 7 years.

Eilam's strategy and execution has led to a substantial rise in the company valuation and its share price between 2014 and the present day, supported by many investment banks. While CEO of NICE, Eilam has won multiple awards for his achievements including some in his country of birth, Israel.

Education and early life

Eilam served as an officer in the Israel Defense Forces intelligence corps for six years. He has been working in various positions at NICE since he left the army in 1999. He studied at the Tel Aviv University, and received a BSc in Electrical Engineering. He also attended executive leadership programs at INSEAD Business School in France.

Career

Eilam started his career as an engineer at NICE in 1999 and he held multiple senior roles in R&D, product management and sales. Later, he became Vice President of the Interaction Analytics Group, an extension of NICE. Eilam established and led the company's Analytics business, spearheading NICE's transformation into an enterprise software company. Prior to becoming the CEO, Eilam served as the President of NICE Americas, expanding NICE's customer base.

Eilam was announced as the CEO in 2014. Following the announcement, David Kustman as chairman of the board stated, "Barak has proven success in establishing business units and achieving results, and has made a significant contribution to NICE's growth and success. During his career he has demonstrated a high ability to lead organizations, including product and sales teams, to introduce new technologies and foster innovation. His appointment points to the depth of the managerial avenue at NICE. I am confident that he is the right person to motivate NICE to realize the many opportunities in the market and to lead the company to continued growth in the coming years." When Eilam was announced as the CEO, many Israeli newspapers stated that NICE was one of the largest Israeli companies to be floated on the NASDAQ.

Eilam underwent a restructuring operation of the company, which led to selling various services and making a number of new acquisitions. In 2015, the company sold a number of intelligence related services for $158 million to Elbit Systems. along with physical security division for $100 million.

This led the company to acquire a number of companies, mainly based in the United States. This included the cloud-based customer service provider, inContact, based in Utah. The acquisition was the largest in the history of NICE and completely repositioned the company. According to Fortuneit allowed the company to focus more on mid-market, but also on large financial companies to integrate their existing product range. The acquisition was for a total of $940 million.

They also acquired analytics firm Nexidia for $135 million during a similar period. This was seen by many in the media as Eilam further repositioning the company into the customer interaction analytics market. In late 2017, the company also announced the acquisition of workforce analytical software provider, WorkFlex. Previous acquisitions such as Causata enabled NICE to have a diversified portfolio of analytical products. The ongoing acquisitions and strategic realignment meant the stock price of the company also grew by 27% between 2017 and 2018.

In 2018, Eilam and NICE acquired Mattersight Corporation for a total of $90 million. The company which was a SaaS-based enterprise behavioral analytics software provider, became a subsidiary product offering of NICE following the acquisition. During the same year, NICE and Eilam posted a number of positive results regarding company growth. These results were mainly focused on two of the company's cloud platforms, CXone and X-Sight.

Since becoming the CEO of NICE, the company has regularly posted strong financial results. Towards the end of 2018, Eilam was interviewed on CNBC, speaking about the success of NICE and the growth it has experienced over recent years. Eilam stated that since he had become CEO, the company had experienced a fivefold total addressable market growth in a little over four years at the helm of the company.

Eilam outlined a strategy on how NICE would further expand in the coming years. He believed that by increasing the quality of analytics across all sectors of the business, for both internal and customer requirements, it would create more efficient software. He expected NICE to reach a turnover of $2 billion in a short timeframe, with an operating margin of 30%. By the end of 2020 the market cap of NICE reached new record high. Shared price reached $275, representing a 7-fold increase since he became a CEO.

Personal life
Eilam lives in New Jersey with his family.

Accolades
 Globes – People of the Year, 22nd (2014)
 People & Computers magazine – CEO of the Year (2015)
 Calcalist – 50 best managers, 7th (2019)
 Calcalist – 50 best managers, 1st (2020)

References

Living people
Year of birth missing (living people)
Businesspeople in software
Israeli computer programmers
Israeli chief executives
21st-century Israeli inventors
Tel Aviv University people
Israeli businesspeople
Israeli emigrants to the United States
Israeli Jews
Web developers